Flandrica.be (launched 2011) is a web portal that links the online repositories of the Flanders Heritage Library consortium in partnership with the libraries of the Antwerp Museum for Diamonds, Jewellery and Silver and the Plantin-Moretus Museum. It showcases culturally significant or aesthetically pleasing items (manuscripts, printed books, periodicals and engravings) produced in or about what is now the Flemish Region of Belgium. It is funded by the Flemish Community and by the libraries themselves. Material included in Flandrica is also made available through the EU web portal for cultural heritage, Europeana.

See also
Europeana
Mexicana
Canadiana.org

References

External links
 Home page in English

Internet properties established in 2011
Aggregation-based digital libraries
Online archives
Art websites
Scholarly search services
Mass digitization